Sanchai Ratiwatana and Sonchat Ratiwatana won the title , defeating Riccardo Ghedin and Yi Chu-huan in the final 6–4 , 6–4

Seeds

Draw

Draw

References
 Main Draw

Keio Challenger – Doubles
Keio Challenger
2015 Keio Challenger